Arturo López Castro (born August 15, 1989) is a Mexican professional boxer in the Welterweight division.

Professional career
In April 2011, López beat the veteran Gonzalo Juzaino, this bout was held at the Polideportivo Horacio Llamas Grey in Rosario, Sinaloa, Mexico.

References

External links

People from Guasave
Boxers from Sinaloa
Welterweight boxers
1989 births
Living people
Mexican male boxers
21st-century Mexican people